Karen Milenka Torrez Guzmán (born 29 July 1992) is a Bolivian swimmer from Cochabamba. She competes in the Women's 100m Freestyle. She was flag bearer for the nation at the 2012 Summer Olympics.

She qualified to the 2019 Pan American Games during the 2018 South American Games.

In 2019, she represented Bolivia at the 2019 World Aquatics Championships held in Gwangju, South Korea. She competed in the women's 50 metre freestyle and women's 100 metre freestyle events. In both events she did not advance to compete in the semi-finals.

References

External links

Bolivian female swimmers
Sportspeople from Cochabamba
Olympic swimmers of Bolivia
Swimmers at the 2012 Summer Olympics
Swimmers at the 2016 Summer Olympics
1992 births
Living people
Swimmers at the 2011 Pan American Games
Swimmers at the 2015 Pan American Games
Pan American Games competitors for Bolivia
South American Games silver medalists for Bolivia
South American Games medalists in swimming
Competitors at the 2018 South American Games
Swimmers at the 2019 Pan American Games
Swimmers at the 2020 Summer Olympics
21st-century Bolivian women